A list of films produced by the Ollywood film industry based in Bhubaneswar and Cuttack in the 1960s:

References

1960s
Ollywood
Films, Ollywood